Park Cone, elevation , is a summit in the Sawatch Range of central Colorado. The mountain is northeast of Gunnison in the Gunnison National Forest.

See also

List of Colorado mountain ranges
List of Colorado mountain summits
List of Colorado fourteeners
List of Colorado 4000 meter prominent summits
List of the most prominent summits of Colorado
List of Colorado county high points

References

External links

Mountains of Colorado
Mountains of Gunnison County, Colorado
North American 3000 m summits